Félix López (born 1904) was a Chilean labor activist and anarchist. He was an electrician, and steward in the Construction Union. His La Protesta was the first anarchist newspaper in Chile.

References

1904 births
Chilean anarchists
Year of death missing